Megachile atropyga is a species of bee in the family Megachilidae. It was described by van der Zanden in 1995.

References

Atropyga
Insects described in 1995